Highway is a hamlet in the parish of Redruth (where the population was included), Cornwall, England.

References

Hamlets in Cornwall
Redruth